Grasswood, also known as Grasswood Park, is an unincorporated hamlet in Saskatchewan. It is part of the Corman Park rural municipality and is located just south of the city limits of Saskatoon. A second unincorporated hamlet, Furdale, is directly to the west.

The area comprises primarily residences and acreages, with a small commercial area on Highway 11, just outside Saskatoon. The bulk of the area's services are provided by the nearby city, with Highway 11, Clarence Avenue and Lorne Avenue (Highway 219) providing direct access to Saskatoon (an additional access was provided via Preston Avenue until the 2010s when it was closed due to the Stonebridge residential development). Saskatoon provides the hamlet with most of its services, and the nearest major commercial area is the Stonegate "power centre" on Clarence Avenue. The city's Animal Services facility is located in Grasswood.

Grasswood was declared an organized hamlet on March 6, 1992. At the request of its residents, it was reverted to hamlet status on January 1, 1999.

References

Unincorporated communities in Saskatchewan
Corman Park No. 344, Saskatchewan